Edward James Taite Stokes (born 26 June 1950) is a former New Zealand rugby union player. A centre, Stokes represented Bay of Plenty at a provincial level, and was a member of the New Zealand national side, the All Blacks, on the 1976 tour of South America. He played in five matches on that tour, including the game against Uruguay for which international caps were not awarded.

References

1950 births
Living people
Rugby union players from Auckland
New Zealand rugby union players
New Zealand international rugby union players
Bay of Plenty rugby union players
Māori All Blacks players
Rugby union centres